Liangxiang Prison is a prison in Liangxiang, Fangshan District, Beijing, China. It was established in 1960. The prison was once the largest elevator factory in China. It currently houses over 1,000 adult male criminals with 10-15 yr. sentences.

See also
List of prisons in Beijing municipality

References
Citations

Sources
Laogai Research Foundation Handbook

Prisons in Beijing
1960 establishments in China